Mbudum or Mbədam is an Afro-Asiatic language spoken in Cameroon in Far North Province.

Distribution
Mbedam is spoken northeast of Hina in Mokolo arrondissement (Mayo-Tsanaga department, Far North Region). It has about 6,000 native speakers, which are decreasing.

Notes 

Biu-Mandara languages
Languages of Cameroon